Dr. Anne G. Mungai (born 1957) is a Kenyan film director. She is best known for her feature length film, Saikati (1992). She is known for exploring the stories of young African women and the challenges they face while navigating post-colonial Africa.

Life
Anne Mungai graduated from the Kenya Institute for Mass Communications and went on to work there. She is the founder-director of the Shangilia Street Children's Theatre.

In 1993 Mungai co-founded Women in Cinema in Kenya, affiliated with African Women in Film and Video as the provisional committee of its Kenya section.

Directorial career 
Anne Mungai’s directing career began in 1980 with her first short entitled Nkomani Clinic. Since then, she has directed many short- and medium-length films, as well as her first feature film Saïkati. This film, like many of Mungai’s works, focuses on a female character living in Africa during a time that is split between traditional African cultural practices and those brought over from the Western world during colonization.

Saikati (1992) 
Saikati was funded by the Kenya Institute of Mass Communication, as Mungai was an alumnus of the school, with the equipment being provided by the Fredrick Engel Foundation. The script was work-shopped at the Institute with help from a script consultant. Mungai and the script consultant, however, did not have the same vision for Saikati during the writing process, meaning Mungai did not have full creative license of the film. Some of the scenes added to the film went against Mungai’s wishes for the cultural content and story that she had in mind, though Mungai still succeeded in getting the main message across to her audience. The film looks at topics surrounding the challenges women face because of the urbanization of Kenya: how difficult it is to navigate the rural-urban drift of the country while also working to discover who they are in terms of their education, beliefs, and sexuality and how they fit into post-colonial Africa. Saikati looks at these topics from an intersectional point of view. (i.e. through depictions of class, gender, sexuality, age, and ethnicity)

Plot 
The film depicts a young woman named Saikati who is conflicted between wanting to attend university to get an education in the city and following her parents' wishes of her marrying the Chief’s son, which her family has already arranged. Ultimately, she decides to run away from traditional life she once knew and goes to live with her cousin Monica in the city. Monica says she can help Saikati get a job so she can afford to go to school. Once Saikati arrives in the city, however, she realizes that her cousin is a prostitute and the job she has lined up for her is in the same profession. Saikati finds herself caught “between two evils: forced marriage and prostitution.” Saikati realizes that although she wants to run away from forced marriage, she does not want to lose the cultural practices she left behind in the Maasai “Maara.” She decides the culture she left behind is still part of who she is, even though she would like to get an education.

Filmography

Awards

References

Further reading
 Mbye Cham, African Women and Cinema: A Conversation with Anne Mungai, Research in African Literatures, Vol. 25, No. 3 (Autumn 1994), pp. 93–104

External links
 
 Allen Wildisrael, The Filmmaking Journey of Anne Mungai, the first Kenyan woman filmmaker

 African Women in Cinema Anne Mungai Trailblazer

1957 births
Living people
Kenyan film directors
Kenyan women film directors